The 2003 Züri-Metzgete was the 88th edition of the Züri-Metzgete road cycling one day race. It was held on 17 August 2003 as part of the 2003 UCI Road World Cup. The race was won by Daniele Nardello of Italy.

Result

References 

Züri-Metzgete
Züri-Metzgete
2003